Doljani (Serbian Cyrillic: Дољани) is a village in Bosnia and Herzegovina. According to the 1991 census, the village is located in the municipality of Čapljina.

Demographics 

According to the 2013 census, its population was 495.

References

External links 

 Čapljina Portal umrli
 Official results from the book: Ethnic composition of Bosnia-Herzegovina population, by municipalities and settlements, 1991. census, Zavod za statistiku Bosne i Hercegovine - Bilten no.234, Sarajevo 1991.

Villages in the Federation of Bosnia and Herzegovina
Bosnia and Herzegovina–Croatia border crossings
Croat communities in Bosnia and Herzegovina
Populated places in Čapljina